Themen is a surname. Notable people with the surname include:

Art Themen (born 1939), English jazz saxophonist
Jurgen Themen (born 1985), Surinamese sprinter
Justine Themen, theatre director